In mathematics, Gaussian measure is a Borel measure on finite-dimensional Euclidean space Rn, closely related to the normal distribution in statistics. There is also a generalization to infinite-dimensional spaces. Gaussian measures are named after the German mathematician Carl Friedrich Gauss. One reason why Gaussian measures are so ubiquitous in probability theory is the central limit theorem. Loosely speaking, it states that if a random variable X is obtained by summing a large number N of independent random variables of order 1, then X is of order  and its law is approximately Gaussian.

Definitions
Let n ∈ N and let B0(Rn) denote the completion of the Borel σ-algebra on Rn. Let λn : B0(Rn) → [0, +∞] denote the usual n-dimensional Lebesgue measure. Then the standard Gaussian measure γn : B0(Rn) → [0, 1] is defined by

for any measurable set A ∈ B0(Rn). In terms of the Radon–Nikodym derivative,

More generally, the Gaussian measure with mean μ ∈ Rn and variance σ2 > 0 is given by

Gaussian measures with mean μ = 0 are known as centred Gaussian measures.

Properties
The standard Gaussian measure γn on Rn
 is a Borel measure (in fact, as remarked above, it is defined on the completion of the Borel sigma algebra, which is a finer structure);
 is equivalent to Lebesgue measure: , where  stands for absolute continuity of measures;
 is supported on all of Euclidean space: supp(γn) = Rn;
 is a probability measure (γn(Rn) = 1), and so it is locally finite;
 is strictly positive: every non-empty open set has positive measure;
 is inner regular: for all Borel sets A,  so Gaussian measure is a Radon measure;
 is not translation-invariant, but does satisfy the relation  where the derivative on the left-hand side is the Radon–Nikodym derivative, and (Th)∗(γn) is the push forward of standard Gaussian measure by the translation map Th : Rn → Rn, Th(x) = x + h;
 is the probability measure associated to a normal probability distribution:

Infinite-dimensional spaces
It can be shown that there is no analogue of Lebesgue measure on an infinite-dimensional vector space. Even so, it is possible to define Gaussian measures on infinite-dimensional spaces, the main example being the abstract Wiener space construction. A Borel measure γ on a separable Banach space E is said to be a non-degenerate (centered) Gaussian measure if, for every linear functional L ∈ E∗ except L = 0, the push-forward measure L∗(γ) is a non-degenerate (centered) Gaussian measure on R in the sense defined above.

For example, classical Wiener measure on the space of continuous paths is a Gaussian measure.

References

See also

  - a generalisation of Gaussian measure
 
 
 

Measures (measure theory)
Stochastic processes